The 1975 South Dakota Coyotes football team represented the University of South Dakota  as a member of the North Central Conference (NCC) during the 1975 NCAA Division II football season. Led by first-year head coach Beanie Cooper, the Coyotes compiled an overall record of 3–8 with a mark of 1–6 in conference play, trying for seventh place in the NCC.

Schedule

References

South Dakota
South Dakota Coyotes football seasons
South Dakota Coyotes football